The MGM Theater of the Air is a one-hour radio dramatic anthology in the United States. It was broadcast on WMGM in New York City and syndicated to other stations via electrical transcription October 14, 1949 – December 7, 1951. It was carried on Mutual January 5-December 27, 1952.

Format
A 1950 trade publication described the program as a "Big time production ... featuring adaptions of MGM and other screen properties with top-ranking names of screen and theater."

Development and syndication
Development of The MGM Theater of the Air was a departure from the parent company's previous practices. An article in a 1949 issue of Billboard noted that MGM "thruout [sic] the years has extended scant co-operation on the program level" to WMGM (which had been WHN). "Theater of the Air" and five other programs were set to be produced by MGM for broadcast on WMGM and KMGM (an FM station in Hollywood) and syndicated to other stations. The programs totaled about six hours of air time per week.

Beginning September 1, 1949, eight programs (including The Story of Dr. Kildare, The Adventures of Maisie, Crime Does Not Pay and The Hardy Family) were available to "big stations and little stations," as promoted in an ad for Metro-Goldwyn-Mayer Radio Attractions. The programs attracted interest from stations even before the official date when they would be available. Between 150 and 200 stations sought information about the shows "within a few days of the initial public announcement." An initial estimate was "The eight programs will cost MGM close to $1,500,000 per year for production and talent charges."

A reviewer of an early episode of The MGM Theater of the Air commented, "In slickness of production this hour-long program compares very favorably with many of its network brothers."

Move to Mutual Broadcasting System
The MGM Theater of the Air and other MGM-produced programs moved from syndication to network distribution the week of December 31, 1951. Mutual began carrying the MGM productions Woman of the Year (based on the movie of the same name), Crime Does Not Pay, The Black Museum, The Story of Dr. Kildare, MGM Musical Comedy Theater of the Air, The Modern Adventures of Casanova, The Gracie Fields Show, The Adventures of Maisie, The Hardy Family and The MGM Theater of the Air.

Broadcasting magazine reported on Mutual's "extensive promotion campaign" for the MGM package: "The campaign was launched via distribution -- to advertisers, agencies and radio editors -- of boxes of gingerbread men in the shape of Mutual's 'Mr. Plus' trademarks and MGM's 'Leo the Lion,' along with details of the Mutual-MGM program tie-up." Despite the network's promotional efforts, however, the program lasted only one year on Mutual.

Personnel
By its nature, The MGM Theater of the Air had no regular cast. Different MGM movie stars of the era were featured each week. They included Marlene Dietrich, Ronald Reagan, Joan Bennett, George Murphy and Nina Foch.

Howard Dietz, vice-president of MGM, was the program's host, with Carey Wilson as substitute host. Ed Stokes was the announcer, with Bob Williams as his substitute. Marx Loeb was the director. Raymond Katz was the producer. Joel Herron was the music conductor.

See also

Academy Award Theater
Author's Playhouse
Brownstone Theater
The Campbell Playhouse
Cavalcade of America
CBS Radio Workshop
Ford Theatre
General Electric Theater
Lux Radio Theatre
The Mercury Theatre on the Air
The Screen Guild Theater
Screen Director's Playhouse
Stars over Hollywood (radio program)

References

External links

Episodic logs
Episodic log of The MGM Theater of the Air from Jerry Haendiges Vintage Radio Logs
Episodic log of The MGM Theater of the Air (and more) from The Digital Deli Too

Streaming episodes
Streaming episodes of The MGM Theater of the Air from the Internet Archive
Streaming episodes of The MGM Theater of the Air from Old Time Radio Researchers Library

1940s American radio programs
1950s American radio programs
American radio dramas
Anthology radio series
Mutual Broadcasting System programs